The 2019 IFF Women's World Floorball Championships qualification  is a series of tournaments to decide teams which will play in the 2019 Women's World Floorball Championships. The 2019 World Championship will feature 16 teams. 1 place were allocated to the hosts, Switzerland. The remaining 15 places will be determined by a qualification process, in which entrants from among the other teams from the five IFF confederations will compete.

Qualified teams

Qualification process
The distribution by confederation for the 2019 Women's World Floorball Championships will be:

 Asia and Oceania (AOFC): 4 places 
 Europe (no continental confederation but organized by IFF): 10 places (Switzerland qualified automatically as host nations for a total of 11 places)
 Americas (no continental confederation but organized by IFF): 1 place

Summary

American qualification
The American qualification were played between 8 and 9 February 2019 in Detroit, United States.

Group composition

Notes
Teams in bold qualified for the final tournament.
(H): Qualification group hosts

Group AMER

Asia-Oceania qualification 
The Asia-Oceania qualification were played between 27 January to 1 February 2019 in Bangkok, Thailand.

Group composition

Notes
Teams in bold qualified for the final tournament.
(H): Qualification group hosts

Group A

Group B

Final round
All times are local (UTC+7).

Seventh place game

Semifinals

Fifth place game

Third place game

Final

Final ranking

European qualification

Group composition

Notes
Teams in bold qualified for the final tournament.
(H): Qualification group hosts

Group EUR1
The European qualification group EUR1 were played between 30 January to 3 February 2019 in Gdańsk, Poland.

Group EUR2
The European qualification group EUR2 were played between 30 January to 3 February 2019 in Trencin, Slovakia.

Group EUR3
The European qualification group EUR3 were played between 30 January to 3 February 2019 in Gdańsk, Poland.

Group EUR4
The European qualification group EUR4 were played between 31 January to 3 February 2019 in Trencin, Slovakia.

Ranking of third-placed teams
The two best third-placed teams from the groups qualified for the final tournament. Matches against the fifth-placed team are not included in this ranking.

Floorball World Championships
2019 in floorball